HMS Rochester was a 50-gun fourth rate ship of the line of the Royal Navy, launched at Chatham Dockyard in 1693.

She was rebuilt to the 1706 Establishment at Deptford Dockyard, and was relaunched on 19 March 1716. In 1744 she was renamed HMS Maidstone, and converted for use as a hospital ship. Maidstone was broken up in 1748.

Notes

References

Lavery, Brian (2003) The Ship of the Line - Volume 1: The development of the battlefleet 1650-1850. Conway Maritime Press. .

Ships of the line of the Royal Navy
1690s ships